The 2010 Formula Lista Junior season was the eleventh Formula Lista Junior season. It began on 17 April at the Hockenheimring and ended on 26 September at Monza after twelve races held at six meetings.

With top five finishes in each of the twelve races including five victories, Jo Zeller Racing's Michael Lamotte finished the season as champion by 29 points, to give his team their first Formula Lista title. Second place in the championship was taken by Daltec Racing's Yanick Mettler, who won two races – at the first and last meetings of the season – at Hockenheim and Monza, as well as taken six other podium placings. Seven podium finishes in the last eight races including victories at Most and the second Hockenheim meeting allowed Melville McKee of the Hope Pole Vision Racing team to finish the season in third position. Eric Neuber's CSR Motorsport car finished fourth in the championship, although winless Neuber was aided by ten top-five finishes, while Jimmy Antunes completed the top five, winning a race at Most. Christof von Grünigen was the only other winner during the season, sweeping the Nürburgring races in one of three appearances during the season. Daltec Racing's strength in numbers – running up to six cars at certain meetings – allowed them to pip Jo Zeller Racing, who ran only Lamotte during the season, to the Teams' Championship by seven points.

Teams and drivers
 All cars were BMW-engined Mygale chassis.

Race calendar and results

Championship standings

Drivers' championship

Teams' championship

References

External links
 Official website

Formula Lista Junior
Formula Lista Junior
Lista Junior